Martti Välimaa (born 27 February 1989, in Imatra) was an American football defensive tackle, for the Dresden Monarchs of the GFL.

He was a member of various elite teams in Europe, such as Dresden Monarchs, Turku Trojans, Seinäjoki Crocodiles and in the Austrian Football League for the Cineplexx Blue Devils. He was a member of national team Finland from 2006 till 2010 and the captain of the junior national team from 2006 till 2008.

In 2009, Martti was honoured with an  All-star selection in Vaahteraliiga after outstanding season as a Trojan.

In 2012, after helping his team to make it into a GFL semifinals, he announced his retirement from the professional sport.

External links 

 Interview with Martti
 Maple League All-Stars 2009
 Maple League News 2010

1989 births
Living people
Finnish players of American football
People from Imatra
German Football League players
Sportspeople from South Karelia